Wellington National Park is a national park in Western Australia, located  west of Collie and approximately  south of Perth in the Shire of Collie along the Coalfields Highway.

Description
The  park has a hilly terrain and is intersected by streams; the Collie River valley is in the middle of the park, as is Wellington Dam. The park is within the Yilgarn Craton geological province composed of belts of metamorphosed sedimentary and volcanic rocks, including large areas of granite.

Facilities
Potter's Gorge has a camping area at the edge of a lake, catering for tents and caravans. There are also barbeques, picnic tables and multi-access toilets.
Honeymoon Pool also has a camping area and the river is safe for swimming and canoeing. There are picnic tables, barbeques, fire pits with wood supplied and toilets. A boardwalk and platform are built on the river bank for ease of access and there are several walk trails throughout the area. 
The area around Wellington Dam has a kiosk and a camping area.

History
The land now occupied by the park was formerly owned by the Worsley Timber Company. It was gazetted as a class A reserve and set aside for the purpose of "national park" in 2000.

Flora
The park is within the Jarrah Forest bioregion and is predominantly composed of unique Eucalyptus marginata (jarrah), Corymbia calophylla (marri) and Eucalyptus patens (yarri or blackbutt) forests. 
Species found commonly as part of the understorey include Banksia grandis (bull banksia), Allocasuarina fraseriana (sheoak), Bossiaea aquifolium (waterbush), Persoonia longifolia (snottygobble) and Xanthorrhoea preissii (grasstree).

Fauna
The park provides habitat for a range of fauna; 66 species of birds are found within the park. Endangered species found in the park include the chuditch, western ringtail possum, quokka, brush-tailed phascogale, woylie, carpet python, peregrine falcon, red-tailed black cockatoo, Carnaby's black cockatoo and Baudin's cockatoo.

See also
 List of protected areas of Western Australia

References

National parks of Western Australia
South West (Western Australia)
Jarrah Forest